Gounder is a title used by various communities in the Indian state of Tamil Nadu.

Etymology
There are number of derivations for the title. One theory derives it from the Tamil word Kaamindan, meaning "noble protector of the country", later modified as Kavundan or Gounder.

According to S. N. Sadasivan the Tamil Kavundans or Goundans branched off from the Vokkaligas and both might have a common origin from the Kuruba.

History
During the British Raj era, some Gounders migrated to Malayan rubber plantations as Kanganis to manage the coolies.

References

 
Tamil society
Indian surnames
Karnataka society
Social groups of Tamil Nadu